Tails, or "The Amnesic Incognito Live System," is a security-focused Debian-based Linux distribution aimed at preserving privacy and anonymity. It connects to the Internet exclusively through the anonymity network Tor. The system is designed to be booted as a live DVD or live USB and leaves no digital footprint on the machine unless explicitly told to do so. It can also be run as a virtual machine, with some additional security risks. The Tor Project provided financial support for its development in the beginnings of the project, and continues to do so alongside numerous corporate and anonymous sponsors.

History 
Tails was first released on June 23, 2009. It is the next iteration of development on Incognito, a discontinued Gentoo-based Linux distribution. The Tor Project provided financial support for its development in the beginnings of the project. Tails also received funding from the Open Technology Fund, Mozilla, and the Freedom of the Press Foundation.

Laura Poitras, Glenn Greenwald, and Barton Gellman have each said that Tails was an important tool they used in their work with National Security Agency whistleblower Edward Snowden.

From release 3.0, Tails requires a 64-bit processor to run.

Features 

Tails's pre-installed desktop environment is GNOME 3. The system includes essential software for functions such as reading and editing documents, image editing, video watching and printing. Other software from Debian can be installed at the user's behest.

Tails includes a unique variety of software that handles the encryption of files and internet transmissions, cryptographic signing and hashing, and other functions important to security. It is pre-configured to use Tor with multiple connection options. It tries to force all connections to use Tor and blocks connection attempts outside Tor. For networking, it features a modified version of Tor Browser with the inclusion of uBlock Origin, instant messaging, email, file transmission and monitoring local network connections for security. 

By design, Tails is "amnesic". It runs in the computer's Random Access Memory (RAM) and does not write to a hard drive or other storage medium. The user may choose to keep files, applications or some settings on their Tails drive in "Persistent Storage". Though the Persistent Storage is encrypted by default, it is not hidden and detectable by forensic analysis. While shutting down, Tails overwrites most of the used RAM to avoid a cold boot attack.

Security incidents
In 2014 Das Erste reported that the NSA's XKeyscore surveillance system sets threat definitions for people who search for Tails using a search engine or visit the Tails website. A comment in XKeyscore's source code calls Tails "a comsec [communications security] mechanism advocated by extremists on extremist forums".

In the same year, Der Spiegel published slides from an internal National Security Agency presentation dating to June 2012, in which the NSA deemed Tails on its own as a "major threat" to its mission and in conjunction with other privacy tools as "catastrophic".

In 2017, the FBI used malicious code developed by Facebook, identifying sexual extortionist and Tails user Buster Hernandez through a zero-day vulnerability in the default video player. The exploit was never explained to or discovered by the Tails developers, but it is believed that the vulnerability was patched in a later release of Tails. It was not easy to find Hernandez: for a long time, the FBI and Facebook had searched for him with no success, resorting to developing the custom hacking tool.

See also 

 Crypto-anarchism
 Dark web
 Deep web
 Freedom of information
 GlobaLeaks
 GNU Privacy Guard
 I2P
 Internet censorship
 Internet privacy
 Off-the-Record Messaging
 Proxy server
 Security-focused operating systems
 Tor (anonymity network)
 Tor2web
 Whonix

References

External links 

 
 

2009 software
Anonymity networks
Debian-based distributions
Free security software
I2P
Linux distributions
Operating system distributions bootable from read-only media
Privacy software
Tor (anonymity network)